Internet Explorer Administration Kit (IEAK), is a stand-alone freeware computer program from Microsoft that allows software developers, ISPs, content providers and large organizations to build, deploy and manage customized Internet Explorer installation packages for either distribution or internal use.  Knowledge of the IEAK is tested on Microsoft exams for MCSE.

Features
IEAK can be used by organizations to customize the settings for the browser, integrate add-ons, change branding of the browser to use customized logos, and centrally manage the distribution of the software. The IEAK consists of several components, including:
Internet Explorer Customization Wizard, which lets an organization customize the configuration of the browser, and create redistributable packages with the customizations applied.
IEAK Profile Manager, which lets create multiple sets of IE settings and customizations. Any of the set can then be quickly selected for building the redistributable.
IEAK Toolkit, which provides tools, sample scripts and resources such as bitmaps.

Versions
The first IEAK was released for Internet Explorer 3 Since then, there has been a corresponding IEAK for every Internet Explorer release.

References

External links
Internet Explorer Administration Kit (IEAK) Information and Downloads
Internet Explorer Administration Kit 11
Internet Explorer Administration Kit 10
Internet Explorer Administration Kit 9
Internet Explorer Administration Kit 8
Internet Explorer Administration Kit 7
Internet Explorer 6 Administration Kit Service Pack 1: Deployment Guide
Internet Explorer Administration Kit (IEAK): Guides, Resources & Downloads

Internet Explorer